Alban Vineyards is a California wine estate producing various Rhône style blends and varietal wines. The winery is located in Edna Valley, near Arroyo Grande in the southern corner of San Luis Obispo County.

History
Starting in 1985, John Alban planted grapes for other people until he bought an estate in 1989.  With a focus on creating wines made from Rhône Valley varietals, Alban came to be a pioneer of the Rhone Rangers movement, and is considered one of the most influential American Rhone producers.

Alban's work, along with that of Josh Jensen of Calera Wine Company in San Benito County, helped to significantly expand plantings of Viognier in California at a time when the variety was near extinction.

Production
Within a  area, the vineyard area extends , planted with varieties Syrah, Viognier and Roussanne. 
Among the wines produced are the Lorraine Vineyard, Reva Vineyard Syrah, Seymour's Vineyard Syrah, and Pandora, a blend of Grenache and Syrah. There has also been produced a dessert wine with ca. 5% botrytis grapes and aged in 50% new oak, named Rotten Luck.

References

External links
 Alban Vineyards official site

Wineries in San Luis Obispo County
Companies based in San Luis Obispo County, California
Food and drink companies established in 1989
1989 establishments in California